Velinga or Veling is a village in Ponda taluka, Goa. The panchayat (village council) area it is part of consists of famous temples, including the Lord Manguesh Temple. The main occupation in the area is agriculture, horticulture, and homestead system of gardening (kulagars).  In the village panchayat, there are some 35 water springs.

Panchayat
It is part of the Veling-Priol-Kunkoliem Village Panchayat.

The village panchayat (village council) under which it comes—Veling Priol Cuncoliem—is considered to be an 'A' Class Village Panchayat, and covers three revenue villages named above.

Location, surroundings
The north-eastern locality of the village lies close to the main road that winds through Ponda taluka. In the village is the GEC Infinity Ground, while the close proximity is home to the Madkai IDC (Industrial Development Corporation) Office, the Shivaji Maharaj Fort at Farmagudi, and a number of prominent and scenic temples.

This area is situated roughly 10 km away from the sub-district headquarters, the town of Ponda, and about 20 km away from the district headquarters and state capital of Goa, Panaji or Panjim.

Area, population
In the 2011 Census, Velinga was found to have an area of 315 hectares, with a total of 444 households, and a population of 1,921 persons—comprising 1,001 males and 920 females.  The zero-to-six age group population comprised 145 children, of these 79 were males and 66 females.

References

External links
Shantadurga Dussera, Veling
Narsimha Mandir, Veling
Zagor at Veling-Mardol
Prudent programme at Veling-Mardol

Cities and towns in North Goa district